The 2017 National Invitational Softball Championship (NISC) began on May 16, 2017 and concluded on May 24. The Liberty University Lady Flames defeated the Lamar University Lady Cardinals in a controversial rain-shortened two-game final on Liberty's home.field in Lynchburg, Virginia.

Tournament play and team selection

The NISC tournament is designed to feature forty-eight teams in eight six-team regional tournaments with the regional champions advancing to a National Finals tournament. The regionals and the Finals are double-elimination competitions.

For the inaugural tournament, only fifteen of the thirty-two NCAA conferences sent an automatic qualifier (AQ). Seven schools having non-losing records and RPIs in the top 100 entered the tournament with "National RPI" bids. Four other teams with non-losing records against challenging schedules were added as "At-large" teams. The twenty-six teams were placed in six regional tournaments of four or five teams. The six regional champions advanced to the National Finals at Liberty University, a site that was determined after the regional competitions.

Brackets
Source:

The six regional tournaments were played May 16–18, 2017.

The regional and finals competitions were double-elimination tournaments.

The inaugural National Invitational Softball Championship finals were played May 21–24, 2017 at Liberty University in Lynchburg, Virginia. Teams were seeded by their RPIs.

 # = Game called after 5 innings for inclement weather.

Championship Game

Finals controversy
The tournament had been plagued all week by intermittent heavy rains, In the first Liberty–Lamar Finals game, Lamar had a 5–4 lead after six innings, but Liberty scored four seventh inning runs on their home field to win 8–5. Lamar coach  Holly Bruder did not want to start the decisive game because of the threatening weather, but tournament director Dave King opted to have the game played, since it was the last day that had been scheduled for the tournament. In the second Finals game, Lamar scored four runs in the top half of the sixth inning to take a 5–3 lead. With two outs in the bottom of the inning, the rains resumed, soaking the field and making it unplayable. Under NCAA rules, in such a situation, the score reverts to the end of the last completed inning. Lamar's four runs were negated, and Liberty was declared the winner of the deciding game, 3–1, giving the Flames the inaugural NISC tournament. The decision to call the game was made only nineteen minutes after the rains hit, despite the fact that a games on the previous day had been delayed for an hour in one case and four and a half hours in another. As soon as the decision was announced, softball fans around the country and officials of Lamar's Southland Conference were irate. "Nobody foresaw this situation would happen," King said. "You can blame me for this."

2017 NISC All-Tournament Team
Source =

See also
National Invitational Softball Championship
NCAA Division I Softball Championship

References

External links
 NISC website

Tournament
National Invitational Softball Championship
2017 in sports in Virginia
2017 in women's softball
2017 in American women's sports